Lathyrus pisiformis is a species of flowering plant belonging to the family Fabaceae.

Its native range is Central and Eastern Europe to Mongolia and Caucasus.

References

pisiformis